Kinga Kozak (born 15 October 2002) is a Polish professional footballer who plays for Glasgow City. Before moving to Scotland in 2022 she previously played for Polish club Czarni Sosnowiec. She made her debut for Poland in October 2020 at the age of 18.

Club career
Kozak was inspired to play football by watching her older brother Miłosz play. She came to notice playing for her primary school team UKS Biskupianka Stara Krobia, and was scouted by Medyk Konin. In 2017–18 she was the national top scorer for Medyk at under-16 level, but transferred to GKS Katowice that summer because she wanted to play at first team level in the Ekstraliga.

She was successful in three years at GKS Katowice, scoring 29 goals in 71 games across all competitions. In June 2021 she signed a one-year contract with the national champions Czarni Sosnowiec. With Czarni Sosnowiec she won the Polish Cup and played in the 2021–22 UEFA Women's Champions League first round defeat by Ferencváros.

International career
Kozak made her senior international debut for Poland aged 18 years and eight days old in a 3–0 UEFA Women's Euro 2022 qualifying Group D win over Azerbaijan, played behind closed doors in Warsaw on 23 October 2020. She scored her first goal in Poland's 7–0 win over Kosovo in the final game of the 2023 FIFA Women's World Cup qualification – UEFA Group F series on 6 September 2022.

International goals

Scores and results list Poland's goal tally first, score column indicates score after each Kozak goal.

Personal life
Kozak's older brother Miłosz is also a professional footballer. In 2022 she appeared on the Turbokozak reality television show, screened on Canal+ Premium.

Honours
Czarni Sosnowiec
Polish Cup: 2021–22

References

External links

2002 births
Living people
Polish women's footballers
Poland women's international footballers
Glasgow City F.C. players
Expatriate women's footballers in Scotland
Polish expatriate sportspeople in Scotland
Scottish Women's Premier League players
Women's association football forwards
Sportspeople from Greater Poland Voivodeship
People from Gostyń County
KKS Czarni Sosnowiec players